John Davis (October 28, 1877 – June 9, 1970) was an American sailor serving in the United States Navy during the Spanish–American War who received the Medal of Honor for bravery.

Biography
Davis was born October 28, 1877, in Germany, and after entering the navy he was sent as a Gunner's Mate Third Class to fight in the Spanish–American War aboard the ).

Davis was warranted as a boatswain on May 16, 1904, and was promoted to the chief boatswain on May 16, 1910.  During World War I received a temporary promotion to lieutenant on July 1, 1918.

He was the last living recipient of the Medal of Honor from the Spanish–American War when he died June 9, 1970, at the age of 92. He was buried at Arlington National Cemetery, Arlington, Virginia.

Medal of Honor citation
Rank and organization: Gunner's Mate Third Class, U.S. Navy. Place and date: On board U.S.S. Marblehead at Cienfuegos, Cuba, 11 May 1898. Entered service at: New York, N.Y. Born: 28 October 1877, Germany. G.O. No.: 521, 7 July 1899.

Citation:

On board the U.S.S. Marblehead, during the operation of cutting the cable leading from Cienfuegos, Cuba, 11 May 1898. Facing the heavy fire of the enemy, Davis set an example of extraordinary bravery and coolness throughout this action.

See also

 List of Medal of Honor recipients for the Spanish–American War

References

External links
 

1877 births
1970 deaths
United States Navy Medal of Honor recipients
United States Navy sailors
German emigrants to the United States
American military personnel of the Spanish–American War
United States Navy personnel of World War II
German-born Medal of Honor recipients
Burials at Arlington National Cemetery
Spanish–American War recipients of the Medal of Honor
United States Navy personnel of World War I